"Et l'amour s'en va" is a song by Joe Dassin. It was released in 1977 as a single on CBS, with "Le château de sable" on the other side.

The song is credited to Vito Pallavicini, Claude Lemesle, Salvatore Cutugno and Michele Vasseur.

"Et l'amour s'en va" reached no. 29 in Flanders (Dutch Belgium).

Track listing 
7" single (CBS 5291)
 "Et l'amour s'en va" (3:40)
 "Le château de sable" (3:12)

Charts

References 

1977 songs
1977 singles
Joe Dassin songs
French songs
CBS Disques singles
Songs written by Toto Cutugno
Songs with lyrics by Vito Pallavicini
Songs written by Claude Lemesle
Song recordings produced by Jacques Plait